Gastrimargus is a genus of grasshoppers in the subfamily Oedipodinae (tribe Locustini). The recorded distribution of species in this genus includes Africa, Asia, and Oceania.

Species 
Species include:
Gastrimargus acutangulus (Stål, 1873)
Gastrimargus africanus (Saussure, 1888)
Gastrimargus angolensis Sjöstedt, 1928
Gastrimargus crassicollis (Saussure, 1888)
Gastrimargus determinatus (Walker, 1871)
Gastrimargus drakensbergensis Ritchie, 1982
Gastrimargus hyla Sjöstedt, 1928
Gastrimargus immaculatus (Chopard, 1957)
Gastrimargus insolens Ritchie, 1982
Gastrimargus lombokensis Sjöstedt, 1928
Gastrimargus marmoratus (Thunberg, 1815) - type species (as "Gryllus virescens" Thunberg)
Gastrimargus miombo Ritchie, 1982
Gastrimargus mirabilis Uvarov, 1923
Gastrimargus musicus (Fabricius, 1775)
Gastrimargus nubilus Uvarov, 1925
Gastrimargus obscurus Ritchie, 1982
Gastrimargus ochraceus Sjöstedt, 1928
Gastrimargus ommatidius Huang, 1981
Gastrimargus rothschildi Bolívar, 1922
Gastrimargus subfasciatus (Haan, 1842)
Gastrimargus verticalis (Saussure, 1884)
Gastrimargus wahlbergii (Stål, 1873)
Gastrimargus willemsei Ritchie, 1982

References

Oedipodinae
Acrididae genera
Orthoptera of Africa
Orthoptera of Asia
Orthoptera of Oceania